The Greece men's national water polo team represents Greece in international men's water polo competitions and it is organized and run by the Hellenic Swimming Federation.

Greece has a long tradition of strong presence at international level, with their major successes being the two bronze medals won at the World Championship in 2005 and 2015. The Greeks have also won a silver medal at the World Cup in 1997, three bronze medals at the World League in 2004, 2006 and 2016, as well as one silver (2018) and four bronze medals (1951, 1991, 1993, 2013) at the Mediterranean Games.

Moreover, they have closely missed a medal in the 2016 European Championship, the 2004 Olympic Games, the 2003 World Championship and the 1999 European Championship, ending up in the 4th place in all four of them. Greece is one of only nine national teams in the world to have won (at least) a medal in the World Championship, currently occupying the eighth place on the medal table, one above Germany. They have qualified at least for the quarter-finals in all their World Championship participations since 1994, winning the two aforementioned bronze medals and never finishing below the 6th place from 2001 and on.

Honours

Olympic Games 

  Silver medal:
 2020

World Championship
  Bronze medals:
 2005, 2015, 2022

World Cup
  Silver medal:
 1997

World League
  Bronze medals:
 2004, 2006, 2016, 2020

Mediterranean Games
  Silver medal:
 2018
  Bronze medals:
 1951, 1991, 1993, 2013

Competitive record

Olympic Games

Greece has participated 16 times at the Olympic Games, always present in the tournament since 1980. Their best result is the 2nd place at the 2020 Olympics in Tokyo, after losing 13–10 to Serbia in the gold medal game. The Greeks have secured a quarter-finals' presence in six occasions.

World Championship
Greece has a strong presence at the World Aquatics Championships, where they have been placed third in the world in two occasions. The first was in 2005 in Montreal, after their 11–10 victory over Croatia in the bronze medal game, with Georgios Afroudakis scoring the winning goal, with a spectacular backhand shot, with only 11 seconds left in the overtime. The second one was in 2015 in Kazan, after their penalty shootout win over Italy in the bronze medal game. Greece has qualified at least for the quarter-finals in all their tournament participations since 1994, with a 7th place being their lowest position from 2001 and on when the team qualified.

World Cup
Greece had qualified for the FINA Water Polo World Cup in all but two occasions between 1985 and 2006, winning the silver medal in 1997 in Athens, losing 5–8 to the United States in the final.

World League
Greece had a regular presence at the FINA Water Polo World League during the first years of the competition, starting from 2002. They have won four bronze medals so far in 2004, 2006, 2016 and 2020.

European Championship
As one of the most competitive European nations in water polo, Greece is a regular contestant at the European Water Polo Championship since 1989, although they have yet to win a medal, with their best results being the 4th place in 1999 in Florence and in 2016 in Belgrade.

Team

2020 Summer Olympics Silver medal winning squad

World Championship medal-winning squads
The following are the bronze medal-winning Greek rosters in the men's water polo tournaments of the 2005 and the 2015 World Championships:

Notable coaches

 Andreas Garyfallos
 Josep Brasco Cata
 Ivo Trumbić
 Kyriakos Iosifidis
 Mile Nakić
 Giannis Giannouris
 Alessandro Campagna
 Dragan Andrić
 Thodoris Vlachos

See also
 Greece men's Olympic water polo team records and statistics
 Greece women's national water polo team

References

External links
 

 
Men's national water polo teams
Men's sport in Greece